RocketMan (also written as Rocket Man) is a 1997 American comic science fiction film directed by Stuart Gillard and starring Harland Williams, Jessica Lundy, William Sadler, and Jeffrey DeMunn. A partial remake of the 1967 film, The Reluctant Astronaut, it was produced by Walt Disney Pictures and Caravan Pictures, and was released on October 10, 1997.

Plot
NASA is training for the first human mission to Mars by the spacecraft Aries. Due to a supposed glitch in the computer navigation system, NASA looks for the original programmer of the software to understand why it seems to be broken. Fred Z. Randall, the eccentric programmer who wrote the software, meets Paul Wick, the flight director of the Mars mission; William "Wild Bill" Overbeck, the commander of the Mars mission; and astronaut Gary Hackman, the computer specialist. Fred looks at the software and discovers that the problem is actually stemming from a mathematical error made by Gary. After a display of hard-headed stubbornness, Gary is hit in the head by a model of the Pilgrim 1 Mars lander, resulting in a skull fracture. NASA decides to replace him instead of delaying the mission; Fred is brought to NASA to see if he has what it takes to be an astronaut. He goes through a series of exercises, which sees Fred do well, even going as far to break every record that Bill had set. In the end, Fred gets the job.

While getting ready to board the Aries, Fred chickens out and refuses to go on the mission. Bud Nesbitt who Wick claims is the cause of the Apollo 13 accident though Bud later reveals that Wick was responsible, tells Fred about the three commemorative coins given to him by President Johnson. He gave one coin to Neil Armstrong, another to Jim Lovell, and finally shows Randall a gold coin reading "Bravery". "It hasn't done me much good," Bud says, "Maybe it'll mean something to you one day." Randall then quotes the Lion from The Wizard of Oz: "If I were king of the forest!"

Fred, along with Commander Overbeck, geologist Julie Ford, and Ulysses, a trained chimpanzee, will look for fossils on Mars. To save on resources, crew members are put into "hypersleep" for eight months while the ship floats towards Mars. Ulysses purposely takes Fred's "hypersleep chamber" for his own and Fred has to sleep in Ulysses' chimp-sized chamber. He sleeps for only 13 minutes and has to stay up alone for eight months. While looking at Mars weather data, Fred notices severe sandstorms that could endanger the crew. He contacts Bud in Houston and tells him about the storms that are forecast to hit the landing site. If the crew get caught in the storms, they could be lost forever. Bud tells Wick about the situation, but Wick ignores him. The crew makes it to Mars, after Overbeck tells off Fred for being awake the whole time and using all the food—except food that the former despises: (anchovy paste, creamed liver, and gefilte fish)—for painting. They land the Pilgrim on the Martian surface. As Overbeck prepares to be the first human to step on Mars, Fred slips from the ladder and accidentally lands first.
 
A day after the crew lands, the sandstorms arrive ahead of schedule. After almost losing Overbeck and Ulysses in the sandstorm, the crew lifts off from the Martian surface. Wick is replaced by Bud when it becomes clear that Wick does not trust his NASA crew. The ship has almost made it out of the sandstorm when rocks kicked up by the wind hit the lander. Pilgrim 1 loses power and begins to spin out of control. Fred has to rewire the entire system, reboot it and power everything back up in less than two minutes or they will crash. With less than 20 seconds, he has to complete the circuit. He frantically searches for something and finally shoves the commemorative coin into the slot, allowing the lander to regain power. The crew safely return to the Aries orbiting Mars. Fred asks Julie to dance with him in zero gravity to "When You Wish Upon a Star" while wearing a silver tux and a gold dress made from the space blankets that he cut up during his accident with the sleep pod.

As Fred gets ready for hypersleep one last time, Ulysses climbs into his hypersleep chamber once again, forcing Fred to stay up for another eight months on the journey back home.

In a post-credits scene, the crew's flag pole on Mars is shown missing its flag. It is revealed that Randall's American flag boxers, which were earlier used as a replacement for the original flag, have been stolen and worn by a Martian.

Cast
 Harland Williams as Fred Z. Randall
 Jessica Lundy as Julie Ford
 William Sadler as Bill 'Wild Bill' Overbeck 
 Jeffrey DeMunn as Paul Wick
 James Pickens, Jr. as Ben Stevens
 Beau Bridges as Bud Nesbitt
 Peter Onorati as Gary Hackman
 Don Lake as Flight Surgeon
 Blake Nelson Boyd as Gordon A. Peacock
 Shelley Duvall as Mrs. Randall, Fred's Mother (uncredited)
 Gailard Sartain as Mr. Randall, Fred's Father (uncredited)

Production

The film was shot on location at the Lake Point Plaza in Sugar Land, Texas in a recently constructed building for Fluor Corporation. The building exterior was dressed with NASA signage to give the appearance of shooting at the actual NASA site. The movie was also filmed in Moab, Utah for the scenes on the surface on Mars.

The filmmakers spent nine weeks at the Johnson Space Center, in Houston, Texas, shooting at the famous Rocket Park, the gargantuan Building 9 that houses all of the spacecraft mock-ups for the ongoing shuttle missions,  and Building 32, which houses the world's largest thermal vacuum chamber and simulates all conditions of outer space (except zero gravity).

To prepare for their roles as astronauts, the three stars attended the U.S. Space Camp at the U.S. Space & Rocket Center in Huntsville, Alabama, riding in simulators and participating in other activities.

Filming started on September 16, 1996 and wrapped up on November 25, 1996.

Release

Box office
RocketMan opened in theaters on October 10, 1997. It came in at #6 during its opening weekend, grossing $4,472,937. The film's second weekend saw a -33.2% change in attendance, dropping to #7 at the box office, with a gross of $2,987,753. It would drop to #8 at the box office the following weekend with a gross of only $2,074,078.  The film dropped out of the top ten during its fourth weekend, coming in at eleventh place with a gross of $1,454,836. It would fail to regain a top ten spot at the box office through the remainder of its theatrical run. By the end of its theatrical run, the film had taken in $15,448,043 in total domestic gross.

Home media

The film was one of the first Disney titles released on DVD (through a different distribution company, as Disney was not supporting DVD at the time) and soon went out-of-print. In April 2006, the Disney Movie Club began distributing a DVD re-release. On 2018 February 27 Disney Movie Club began distributing a blu-ray 20th anniversary edition re-release.

Reception

In spite of other critics, Roger Ebert gave the film a positive three out of four stars, calling it "a wacky comedy in the Jerry Lewis-Jim Carrey mold".

See also 
 List of films set on Mars

References

External links 
 
 
 
 

1997 films
Caravan Pictures films
1990s science fiction comedy films
1990s English-language films
Films about astronauts
Films about NASA
Films directed by Stuart Gillard
Films produced by Roger Birnbaum
Films scored by Michael Tavera
Films set in Houston
Films shot in Houston
Mars in film
Walt Disney Pictures films
1997 comedy films
American children's comedy films
1990s American films
Films with screenplays by Craig Mazin